Jules Accorsi (born 27 June 1937) is a French professional football player and manager. He is currently in charge of MC El Eulma.

Career
Born in Ajaccio, he began his career with AC Ajaccio. Also he played to the Stade de Reims, Grenoble and SEC Bastia.

In 1970, he started his coaching career in the SEC Bastia as an assistant. Since 1974 he coached French clubs AC Ajaccio, US Corte, ÉF Bastia, FC Calvi and GFCO Ajaccio. Also he worked with foreign clubs in Morocco, Tunisia, Vietnam, Oman, Algeria, Madagascar and Benin. Since July 2010 until May 2012 he was a head coach of the Central African Republic national football team. Since February until June 2014 he coached the MC El Eulma.

References

External links

Profile at Soccerpunter.com

1937 births
Living people
French footballers
Association football midfielders
AC Ajaccio players
Stade de Reims players
Grenoble Foot 38 players
SC Bastia players
French football managers
AC Ajaccio managers
Gazélec Ajaccio managers
Expatriate football managers in Morocco
Difaâ Hassani El Jadidi managers
Expatriate football managers in Tunisia
Expatriate football managers in Vietnam
Expatriate football managers in Oman
Expatriate football managers in Algeria
Expatriate football managers in Madagascar
Expatriate football managers in Benin
Expatriate football managers in the Central African Republic
Central African Republic national football team managers
MC El Eulma managers
Sportspeople from Ajaccio
USC Corte managers
USS Kraké managers
JSM Béjaïa managers
Footballers from Corsica
French expatriate sportspeople in the Central African Republic
French expatriate sportspeople in Morocco
French expatriate sportspeople in Vietnam
French expatriate sportspeople in Tunisia
French expatriate sportspeople in Madagascar
French expatriate sportspeople in Benin
French expatriate sportspeople in Algeria
French expatriate sportspeople in Oman
French expatriate football managers